
Gmina Pokój is a rural gmina (administrative district) in Namysłów County, Opole Voivodeship, in south-western Poland.

The gmina contains part of the protected area called Stobrawa Landscape Park.

Villages
Gmina Pokój contains the villages and settlements of Dąbrówka Dolna, Domaradz, Domaradzka Kuźnia, Fałkowice, Jagienna, Kopalina, Kozuby, Krogulna, Krzywa Góra, Ładza, Lubnów, Paryż, Pokój, Siedlice, Świercowskie, Żabiniec, Zawiść and Zieleniec.

Neighbouring gminas
Gmina Pokój is bordered by the gminas of Dobrzeń Wielki, Domaszowice, Murów, Popielów, Świerczów and Wołczyn.

Twin towns – sister cities

Gmina Pokój is twinned with:
 Enkenbach-Alsenborn, Germany
 Hochspeyer, Germany

References

Pokoj
Namysłów County